The Zabolotye lake ( is a lake in the Sergiyev Posad District of Moscow Oblast. The area of the lake is 3.2 km2 (according to other sources - 1.96 km2 )), the catchment area is 355 km2, the depth of the lake reaches to 5 meters. The banks are wooded.

Geographical location 

The lake is located 0.5 km from the village of Zabolotye and 3 km from the village of Verigino. The Sulat River. a right tributary of Dubna River (the Volga river basin) flows through the lake. The elevation above sea level is 127.8 m.

History 
The lake has a glacial origin, its age is estimated at 10,000 years. For millennia, significant deposits of bottom mud were accumulated in the lake, which was much larger than the present ones, which led to a reduction in its area and the formation of the Dubninsky and Ol'khovsko-Bat'kovskii boggy massifs, as well as the meadows later overgrown with forest.

The lake was and is a resting place for Muscovites. There is evidence that Vladimir Ilich Lenin came to rest near Zabolotoye Lake. From the middle of the 20th century until the 1980s, water quality control measures were carried out and various reclamation projects wer implemented. Since the 1990s, large-scale activities on the lake have ceased. In 2011, the lake and its environs fell under the state program of flooding of marshed, in connection with which the construction of a dam was planned.

A new topographic map shows that the location of the lake is a predominantly swamp, and the name Zabolotye Lake has already been omitted.

Flora and fauna 
The lake is inhabited by crucian, roach, pike, perch. Until the 1960s, the relic seaweed of kladofora lived in thh lake. This has disappeared as a result of reclamation.

Notes

Bibliography 

 
 Озеро Заболотское
 Государственный заказник «Озеро Заболотское и его окрестности»
 Чернова Н. Клин клином // Новая газета. 28 января 2014.

Lakes of Moscow Oblast
LZabolotye